The 1997 Women's World Floorball Championships were the first world championship in women's floorball, following the first world championship for men the previous year. The matches of the championship were played in Mariehamn and Godby, Åland, Finland 3–10 May 1997. Sweden won the tournament and became the first world champions in the history of women's floorball.

Preliminary round
The two best placed teams from each group advances to semifinals. The third placed team from each group plays the game for 5th position. The fourth best teams plays the game for 7th position and so on.

Group A

Group B

Final stage

Statistics

Final ranking

Top scorers

All star team
Goalkeeper: 
Defender: 
Defender: 
Centre: 
Forward: 
Forward: 

MVP:

References

Sources
IFF tournament site

Floorball World Championships
World Floorball Championships
Women's World Championships
International floorball competitions hosted by Finland
Women's World Floorball Championships